The Martin Luther King Jr. Performing and Cultural Arts Complex is a historic building in the King-Lincoln Bronzeville neighborhood of Columbus, Ohio. It was built in 1925 as the Pythian Temple and James Pythian Theater, and was added to the National Register of Historic Places and Columbus Register of Historic Properties in 1983. The building was renovated into the King Arts Complex in 1987, and was vacated in 2019. Community leaders restored the building's use as an arts center in 2021.

History 

The Pythian Temple was designed in the Colonial Revival architectural style by Samuel Plato, an African-American architect, and the only example of his work in Columbus. It was financed by the Knights of Pythias, a Black fraternal organization, and opened in 1926 and could accommodate roughly 1,000 people with a theatre, retail, offices, and lodge rooms. It quickly became the center of entertainment in the neighborhood, hosting performers including Cab Calloway, Count Basie, Duke Ellington and the Cotton Club Dancers.

It was added to the National Register of Historic Places on November 25, 1983.

In 1987, the temple was renovated by African-American owned architecture firm Moody Nolan to combine with Garfield Elementary School. The complex was renamed as the Martin Luther King Jr. Performing and Cultural Arts Complex, in memory of Dr. Martin Luther King Jr.

The building was listed as one of the most endangered sites in the city, in Columbus Landmarks' 2021 list. The King Arts Complex vacated the building in 2019, and a portion of it was listed for sale in 2020. In July 2021, the temple was entered a purchase agreement with the owners by Maroon Arts Group, a Black-led nonprofit based in the neighborhood. The group entered the agreement after the community expressed a desire to save the building.

See also
National Register of Historic Places listings in Columbus, Ohio

References

External links

 

Theatres on the National Register of Historic Places in Ohio
Colonial Revival architecture in Ohio
Theatres completed in 1925
Knights of Pythias buildings
Clubhouses on the National Register of Historic Places in Ohio
National Register of Historic Places in Columbus, Ohio
Columbus Register properties
Endangered buildings in Columbus, Ohio
King-Lincoln Bronzeville
Theatres in Columbus, Ohio
Memorials to Martin Luther King Jr.